Kevin James Grocott (born 31 July 1992) is an English association footballer who plays as a right back or Midfield for Mickleover Sports.

Playing career
Grocott spent time in a youth teams of both Derby County F.C. and Notts County F.C. before he signed with Burton Albion F.C. In May 2010 he signed his first professional contract with a club.

He made his debut on 11 September 2010,as substitute replacing Aaron Webster 40 minutes into a 3–3 draw with Rotherham United F.C.at a Don Valley Stadium. At the point he entered the game Burton were losing 3–0.

On 31 January 2011 Grocott joined Vauxhall Motors F.C. for a month's loan. Grocott made his debut for Vauxhall Motors F.C. against Droylsden F.C. on 1 February 2011.

Grocott an joined Vauxhall Motors on a permanent deal on 25 March after his release from Burton Albion where he stayed until he was released from his contract on 1 October 2011 to join Mickleover Sports.
3 November 2016 Joined Matlock Town F.C.

References

External links
Profile at an Official Burton Albion site

1992 births
Living people
English footballers
Association football fullbacks
Derby County F.C. players
Notts County F.C. players
Burton Albion F.C. players
Vauxhall Motors F.C. players
English Football League players
Northern Premier League players
Mickleover Sports F.C. players
Footballers from Derby